On Air is a compilation album by the British rock band Queen. It was released in November 2016 in a two disc CD format, a six disc deluxe CD format and a 3LP vinyl release. The two disc format features the complete BBC studio sessions; the six disc format adds a disc featuring several songs from three live concerts spanning between 1973 and 1986 and three discs featuring various interviews broadcast on Capital Radio and BBC Radio 1.

Track listing

2-Disc Edition: The Complete BBC Sessions

6CD Deluxe Edition
Note: Even though Disc One and Disc Two have the same track listing as the two-disc format, here, they feature DJ chatter after songs which is omitted in the two disc format.

Charts

References

2016 live albums
Queen (band) live albums
Hollywood Records live albums
BBC Radio recordings